Aileen Thomas (born 3 June 1907, date of death unknown) was a Canadian fencer. She competed in the  women's individual foil event at the 1936 Summer Olympics.

References

1907 births
Year of death missing
Canadian female fencers
Olympic fencers of Canada
Fencers at the 1936 Summer Olympics